The number of elections in Alaska (Iñupiaq: Alaaskam naliġagviat) varies by year, but typically municipal elections occur every year, plus primary and general elections for federal and state offices occur during even-numbered years.  Alaska has a gubernatorial election every four years.  Members of the state's United States congressional delegation run for election or re-election at the times set out in the United States Constitution.  Primary elections assist in choosing political parties' nominees for various positions.  On a regional basis (see list of boroughs and census areas in Alaska), elections also cover municipal issues.  In addition, a special election can occur at any time.

In a 2020 study, Alaska was ranked as the 15th hardest state for citizens to vote in. 

In 2020, Alaskan voters approved an initiative to implement a nonpartisan blanket top-four primary with a single, open primary where candidates from all parties are listed on the ballot and the top four vote-getters advance to the general election. This system went into effect with the 2022 elections. Prior to this, registered voters in Alaska were given a choice between three primary ballots reflecting a semi-closed primary system.  Specifically, Democratic, Libertarian, Alaskan Independence and Independent candidates were listed on one ballot available to all registered voters and Republican candidates were listed on a second ballot available to voters registered as Republican, Nonpartisan or Undeclared.

Ballot measures

Presidential elections

Alaskans have voted in United States presidential elections since 1960. With the exception of the candidacy of Barry Goldwater in 1964, the Republican Party has carried Alaska in every presidential election.

United States congressional delegation elections

United States Senate elections
Alaska has a Class II Senator (currently Dan Sullivan) and a Class III Senator (currently Lisa Murkowski).  Alaska first elected Senators in 1956 under the "Alaska–Tennessee Plan."  They had no vote in the Senate, but were sent to represent Alaska as if they were, to lobby for statehood, and to assume the office of senator should the situation arise.  Alaska's first voting senators were elected in the 1958 election; it was a special election due to the former territory's pending admission as a state.

Class II Senate elections
1960 United States Senate election in Alaska
1966 United States Senate election in Alaska
1972 United States Senate election in Alaska
1978 United States Senate election in Alaska
1984 United States Senate election in Alaska
1990 United States Senate election in Alaska
1996 United States Senate election in Alaska
2002 United States Senate election in Alaska
2008 United States Senate election in Alaska
2014 United States Senate election in Alaska
2020 United States Senate election in Alaska

Class III Senate elections
1962 United States Senate election in Alaska
1968 United States Senate election in Alaska
1974 United States Senate election in Alaska
1980 United States Senate election in Alaska
1986 United States Senate election in Alaska
1992 United States Senate election in Alaska
1998 United States Senate election in Alaska
2004 United States Senate election in Alaska
2010 United States Senate election in Alaska
2016 United States Senate election in Alaska
2022 United States Senate election in Alaska

United States House of Representatives elections
Alaska has had a single congressional district in the United States House of Representatives since statehood was granted in 1959.
1958 United States House of Representatives election in Alaska
1960 United States House of Representatives election in Alaska
1962 United States House of Representatives election in Alaska
1964 United States House of Representatives election in Alaska
1966 United States House of Representatives election in Alaska
1968 United States House of Representatives election in Alaska
1970 United States House of Representatives election in Alaska
1972 United States House of Representatives election in Alaska
1974 United States House of Representatives election in Alaska
1976 United States House of Representatives election in Alaska
1978 United States House of Representatives election in Alaska
1980 United States House of Representatives election in Alaska
1982 United States House of Representatives election in Alaska
1984 United States House of Representatives election in Alaska
1986 United States House of Representatives election in Alaska
1988 United States House of Representatives election in Alaska
1990 United States House of Representatives election in Alaska
1992 United States House of Representatives election in Alaska
1994 United States House of Representatives election in Alaska
1996 United States House of Representatives election in Alaska
1998 United States House of Representatives election in Alaska
2000 United States House of Representatives election in Alaska
2002 United States House of Representatives election in Alaska
2004 United States House of Representatives election in Alaska
2006 United States House of Representatives election in Alaska
2008 United States House of Representatives election in Alaska
2010 United States House of Representatives election in Alaska
2012 United States House of Representatives election in Alaska
2014 United States House of Representatives election in Alaska
2016 United States House of Representatives election in Alaska
2018 United States House of Representatives election in Alaska
2020 United States House of Representatives election in Alaska
2022 United States House of Representatives election in Alaska

Gubernatorial elections 

1958 Alaska gubernatorial election
1962 Alaska gubernatorial election
1966 Alaska gubernatorial election
1970 Alaska gubernatorial election
1974 Alaska gubernatorial election
1978 Alaska gubernatorial election
1982 Alaska gubernatorial election
1986 Alaska gubernatorial election
1990 Alaska gubernatorial election
1994 Alaska gubernatorial election
1998 Alaska gubernatorial election
2002 Alaska gubernatorial election
2006 Alaska gubernatorial election
2010 Alaska gubernatorial election
2014 Alaska gubernatorial election
2018 Alaska gubernatorial election
2022 Alaska gubernatorial election

Alaska Legislature elections
Alaska Senators have terms of four years; half of them are elected every two years.  Alaska Representatives have terms of two years; all of them are elected every two years.  The state's redistricting process allows the power to shorten the terms of state senators should a redistricting action substantially alter their district.
1994 Alaska state elections
1996 Alaska state elections
1998 Alaska state elections
2000 Alaska state elections
2002 Alaska state elections
2004 Alaska state elections
2006 Alaska state elections
2008 Alaska state elections
2010 Alaska state elections
2012 Alaska state elections
2014 Alaska state elections
2016 Alaska state elections

Municipal elections
Virtually all of the state's municipalities hold their general elections in early October, with the notable exception of Anchorage.  North Pole for many years held their elections in November, in the process holding them on the same day as state elections on even-numbered years, but eventually abandoned that in favor of October elections.  Anchorage switched from an early October election day to one in early April around 1992.

Political parties
There are four qualified political parties.
Democratic Party (see also Alaska Democratic Party)
Libertarian Party
Republican Party (see also Alaska Republican Party)
Alaskan Independence Party

Lawsuits launched by Joe Vogler and Jim Sykes, among other lawsuits, led the Alaska Legislature to eventually revamp and relax laws pertaining to party status and ballot access. The first instance of a minor party gaining recognition came in 1982, when the gubernatorial candidacy of Dick Randolph under the Libertarian Party was successful enough to meet the existing party recognition threshold.

See also
Political party strength in Alaska
Women's suffrage in Alaska

References

External links
 Alaska Division of Elections official website
 
 
 
  (State affiliate of the U.S. League of Women Voters)
 

 
Government of Alaska